The Qinling panda (Ailuropoda melanoleuca qinlingensis) is a subspecies of the giant panda, discovered in 1959, but not recognized as a subspecies until 2005. Besides the nominate subspecies, it is the first giant panda subspecies to be recognized.

Characteristics
It differs from the more familiar nominate subspecies by its smaller skull and dark brown and light brown (rather than black and white) fur, and its smaller overall size. Its eye spots are under the lower lid, instead of around the eyes. Brown pandas are exceedingly rare.

Distribution and habitat
Its coloration is possibly a consequence of inbreeding: as the population is closed off from genetic variation and this might have led to the preservation of the mutation responsible.

Conservation and threats
There were an estimated 100 Qinling pandas living in the wild as of 2001.

On August 30, 1989, a female of this species was captured and brought to the Xi'an Zoo to be mated with a regular giant panda. This panda's offspring was black-and-white, but reportedly started becoming brownish as it aged. According to other reports she gave birth to three cubs, all of whom died shortly after being born. The mother, named Dan-Dan, died in 2000.

Due to the Qinling subspecies being restricted in range, it has been exposed to metal toxicants such as copper, nickel, lead, and zinc that are now present in bamboo and soil as a result of the environmental pollution that is ongoing in China. More specifically, studies have indicated that the Qinling subspecies faces such anthropogenic threats so directly due to the fact that heavy concentrations of metals in bamboo and soil are positively correlated with high elevations, thus the Qinling Mountain Range is increasingly affected. Therefore, the conservation of the Qinling pandas may be compromised in the future due to air pollution in China.

Dental health is important for the survival of the Qinling Pandas. These pandas have a survival rate of 5-20 years. The most common dental abnormalities that Qinling Pandas face are dental attrition and fractures. These two abnormalities can impact the survival rate of these pandas.

References

External links

Giant pandas
Mammals of China
Mammals described in 2005
Subspecies